Radja is an Indonesian rock band.

History
Radja formed in Banjarmasin, Indonesia on 17 March 1999 and originally consisted of brothers Ian Kasela (vocals) and Moldy Kusnadi (guitar), as well drummer Adit Taher, and bassist Shuma. In their early days, the band performed in exchange for Nasi Bungkus, a humble Indonesian rice dish, at local cafes. Their name is a form of raja, meaning "king".

In 2001, the band debuted with Lepas Masa Lalu. Unfortunately, due to their label's failure to properly market the album, it never gained any traction and was overall considered a flop. Shuma and Adit left the band not long after and were replaced with bassist Indra Riwayat and drummer Seno Wilbowo. Their second album, Manusia Biasa, sold only 60,000 copies when it was released in 2003.

Their third album, Langkah Baru, was the first Radja released under EMI Music Indonesia and was significantly more successful. Though it contained three new songs, it was primarily a "repackaging" of tracks from previous albums; nonetheless, it sold 1.2 million copies upon its release in 2004 and soared to platinum status in Indonesia. It was one of the top 15 best-selling albums of the year from the EMI Group.

In 2006, they re-released Aku Ada Karena Kau Ada and debuted 1000 Bulan ("1,000 Months"), an Islam themed album, producing 75,000 copies which were only available during that year's Ramadhan. The band's next album was launched in April 2008, titled Membumi.

Because of conflicts over what type of labels to work with, Indra and Seno left the band in 2010 to form Audio Jet and were replaced by Oji, Muhammad Vidin, and Radja keyboardist and synthesizer Aldi Rizky. Seno and Indra returned in 2015. Radja went on a brief hiatus, wherein they did not release music for three years; Ian claims this is due to the band's difficulty adapting to a more digital music market. In 2018, they established their own record label, Istana Musik.

In 2020, they released a new single, "Jangan Mudik Dulu", urging listeners to stay home and take precautions during the COVID-19 pandemic. It also speculates that the COVID-19 pandemic is God's will. They also released "Hidup dan Mati". Their 2021 single, "Sapu Jagat", which focuses on Muslim prayer, was accused of plagiarizing Nissa Sabyan, which Radja denied.

Radja fans are referred to as Radjaku.

Discography

Singles

References

External links
 Official site
 Guitar Chord Radja

Indonesian rock music groups
Indonesian melayu music groups
Musical groups established in 2001